Bend Brewing Company is a brewery based in Bend, Oregon, in the United States. The business was established in 1995 and operates a restaurant in downtown Bend with views of the Deschutes River. Bend Brewing Company also owns Waypoint.

References

External links

 
 Bend Brewing Company at Beer Advocate

1995 establishments in Oregon
American companies established in 1995
Beer brewing companies based in Oregon
Companies based in Bend, Oregon
Restaurants in Bend, Oregon